Gilgiochloa is a genus of African plants in the grass family.

The genus is named after German botanist Ernest Friedrich Gilg (1867–1933) by Robert Knud Friedrich Pilger.

The only known species is Gilgiochloa indurata, native to Rwanda, Burundi, Tanzania, Malawi, Mozambique, and Zambia.

References

Panicoideae
Monotypic Poaceae genera
Flora of Africa